The 1972 Wings Tour Bus or WNO 481 is a Bristol double-decker bus built in 1953. Originally used in Essex and Norfolk, it was painted in psychedelic colours and was used by Paul McCartney's band Wings during their 1972 Wings Over Europe Tour in place of a conventional bus. After returning to service, it was subsequently repainted as it was during the tour and put on display outside a rock cafe in Tenerife in the early 1990s, ending up in a garden for many years before being transported back to the UK in 2017 for restoration.

Service use 

The double-decker bus has a Bristol Commercial Vehicles KSW5G chassis, with a body from Eastern Coach Works. It was built in 1953, registered with the DVLA in November 1953, and originally had a closed upper deck.

It was originally used in Essex and Norfolk in the 1950s–60s for local bus routes. It entered service with Eastern National Omnibus Company in Chelmsford, and was painted plain green. In 1966 the upper deck roof was removed, turning it into an open top bus, and it was repainted cream with a green trim. In this form it was primarily used by Eastern National for regular service routes in seaside areas during the summer months.

The bus was sold to Eastern Counties Omnibus Company in 1968, with the green trim repainted maroon red. It was sold again to a dealer in July 1971, and was bought by Halls Coaches, painted red and grey, and used under the brand Valliant Silverline up until June 1972.

Wings Tour bus 
Rather than using a normal tour bus for the 1972 Wings Over Europe Tour, his first major tour after the break-up of the Beatles, McCartney bought the bus and painted it in psychedelic colours, with the tour name shown in a blue sky over snow-capped mountains, the band's logo above the windscreen, and the band members names stencilled on the back in the order Paul & Linda McCartney; Denny Laine; Henry McCullough; and Denny Seiwell. It was a similar idea to the Beatles' Magical Mystery Tour and Cliff Richard's Summer Holiday from the 1960s.

The seats on the top deck were removed, with mattresses and bean bags for the band and their families to lounge and sleep on (although the band stayed in hotels during the tour), and was also used as a playpen for their children while on the move. The downstairs was carpeted, with four original seats at the front, bunk beds for the kids, and a fully-functioning kitchen in the rear, and there was a stereo. The McCartneys also had a double bed in the bus, which they tried to take into various hotels during the tour.

The Wings logo first appeared on the rear of the bus and was made of wood. It was designed by Neil Dean, who did the work through Tom Salter, of the Gear shop on Carnaby Street, who had been asked to arrange this by Paul McCartney. The "Wings Over Europe" paint work and other renovations were performed by Salter, Dean, Geoffrey Cleghorn and Charlie Smith, along with one or two (unnamed) others who performed other specialist work, such as the rolling destination blind with the tour destinations. Contrary to some recollections and beliefs, the renovation work was done at the Halls/Silverline depot in Cowley Road, Uxbridge, where the bus was stationed at the time, by its owners. The vehicle was noted in the Wings Over Europe tour programme as being provided by "Silverline Tours" and was returned to the owners after the tour. It was never actually owned by Paul McCartney or his associated businesses.

McCartney wanted to have a good time during the tour, noting as the tour began that "We never had time to do that in the Beatle days." In particular, he liked the idea of being out in the sun while traveling rather than stuck inside a vehicle in the heat of July and August.

The bus visited 25 cities in 9 countries, for 25 concerts in July and August 1972, covering . The concert locations were printed and displayed in the bus's spinning destination indicator. Wings member Seiwell later recalled cars zipping by them on European motorways and said of the bus, "It was quite nice, but it didn't make a lot of sense." The bus travelled in convoy with a crew tour bus. Whenever it looked like the buses would not arrive at the venue on time for a concert, a convoy of other vehicles would be sent from the venue to collect them.

During the tour, the band and their family members stayed in luxury hotels rather than in the bus (with hotel extras costing the band most of their wages during the tour). Most of the adults on the bus also smoked cannabis, but rather than storing the drugs on the bus and risking taking them through customs they were regularly posted from England, which caused problems during the tour as the Swedish police discovered the scheme. This prevented the tour from going on to the USA and Japan, and it concluded in Berlin on 24 August 1972.

Later history 
The bus subsequently re-entered service with Halls/Silverline. Halls Coaches was bought by Tricentrol around August 1973 and the bus was painted mustard gold and moved to Dunstable. The bus continued to be used largely for special event hire, particularly at the Epsom Derby, as well as events such as those celebrating the 1977 Queen's Silver Jubilee. 

It was scheduled to be scrapped in 1982, when Roger White from St Albans purchased it for £3,000, and repainted it as it had been during the Wings tour.

In 1989 the bus was painted red and white, and was used in the BAFTA Great British London-Cannes Film Rally in May, the Southend Bus Rally, as well as the 1990 BAFTA Great British Rally, Cardiff-London-Edinburgh, where it was photographed behind Princess Anne. It was repainted with the Wings livery for the third time (and the last time it was repainted) for the Beatles Amsterdam Convention in April 1993.

In August 1993, the bus was put up for auction, with the Wings livery. Its value was estimated as £25,000–£30,000.However the family of Roger White and Sotheby's themselves confirmed in private correspondence that the bus failed to sell at auction and was instead sold shortly thereafter in a private and undisclosed transaction.

The bus was next displayed outside of a rock café venue in Tenerife. It was later moved to the café owner's garden in La Caldera del Rey, Adeje, where it was left to decay. It was spotted there by Justin James in 2007, who bought it even though he did not know what he would do with it. Moving the bus to Oxfordshire in the UK took eight years, partly due to the difficulty in removing it from the garden, which required using cranes. In October 2017 it was loaded onto the Monte Alegre for transport from Algeciras to Felixstowe.

In 2017, McCartney tweeted to say that he had heard it was back in the UK, and to ask its whereabouts. A reply from James confirmed that it was in Oxfordshire.

In 2019 it was put up for auction in Merseyside by Omega Auctions, as part of a Beatles-themed auction, with an estimated selling price of £15,000–£25,000. This was because James's plans to use it for musical children's tours did not work out, and he was emigrating to Australia. He estimated that he had spent around £25,000 on the bus at that point, and said that any profit would go to the charity he was a trustee of, Arms Around the Child. The bus was auctioned with the owner's paperwork, but without a MOT. However, no bids were received and the bus went unsold.

It was subsequently bought by Tom Jennings who set up the 1972 Wings Tour Bus Supporters Club, who fundraised for its restoration. The bus is now being restored in Bristol. A digital 3D model of the bus exists. Although some museums expressed interest in having it as an exhibition, Jennings intends that it would be used on the road again after restoration.

References 

Bristol Commercial Vehicles buses
Paul McCartney and Wings
Vehicles of the United Kingdom
Vehicles introduced in 1953
Bus transport in England
Transport in Tenerife
Individual buses